The spotted Eastern Ghats skink (Sepsophis punctatus) is a species of skink. It endemic to India and known from its type locality in Andhra Pradesh (Darakondah, Golconda Hills, then Madras Presidency) and from Odissa. It is monotypic in the genus Sepsophis.

References

 
Skinks
Reptiles of India
Endemic fauna of India
Taxa named by Richard Henry Beddome
Reptiles described in 1870